Abu al-Layth al-Samarqandi  (Arabic أبو الليث السمرقندي, Abū l-Laiṯ as-Samarqandī; b. 944; d. 983) was a Hanafite jurist and Quran commentator, who lived during the second half of the 10th century. He authored various books on theology and jurist works, including Baḥr al-ʿUlūm, 
بحر العلوم, a Quran exegesis, also known as Tafsir as-Samarqandi, and Tanbīh al-Ġālifīn, تنبيه الغافلين.

Literature 
Abou-l-Laiṯ as-Samarḳandī: Le traité Arabe Muḳaddima d'Abou-l-Laiṯ as-Samarḳandī en version Mamelouk-Kiptchak. - Warszawa : Państwowe Wydawnictwo Naukowe, 1962
Daiber, Hans: The Islamic concept of belief in the 4th/10th century : Abū l-Laiṯ as-Samarkandī's commentary on Abū Ḥanīfa (died 150/767) al-Fiqh al-absāṭ / Introduction, text and commentary by Hans Daiber. Tokyo : Institute for the Study of Languages and Cultures of Asia and Africa, 1995 (Studia Culturae Islamicae; 52)

References

Hanafi fiqh scholars
Maturidis
10th-century scholars
10th-century jurists
Transoxanian Islamic scholars
Islamic asceticism
People from Samarkand
944 births
983 deaths